Gaskin is an English surname. It is a variant of the surname 'Gascon'. Notable people with the surname include:

Arthur Gaskin (1862–1928) British illustrator & designer
Barbara Gaskin (born 1950), British singer
Catherine Gaskin (1929–2009), Australian/Irish author of romance novels
Edward Gaskin (1918–2001), educator and labor leader
George J. Gaskin (1863–1920), American singer
Georgie Gaskin (1866–1934), British designer
Hannibal Gaskin (born 1997), Guyanese swimmer
Ina May Gaskin (born 1940), wife of Stephen Gaskin and author of Spiritual Midwifery (1977)
Leonard Gaskin (1920–2009), American jazz musician
Louis Gaskin (born 1967), American convicted murderer
Myles Gaskin (born 1997), American football player
Stephen Gaskin (1935–2014), American counterculture icon
Walter E. Gaskin, Commanding General, U.S. Marine Corps Base Camp Lejeune
Winifred Gaskin (1916–1977), Guyanese teacher, journalist and politician

References

English-language surnames